Grabučiškės is a village in the Kaišiadorys District Municipality, Lithuania, located in the Kauno Marios Regional Park, 5 kilometers northwest of Rumšiškės, by the Jokūbiniai stream. Located near the highway, by the shore of Kaunas Reservoir, there is a rest area. A wooden cross was built at the entrance to the village. The village is surrounded by the Rumšiškės Forest.

History 
Most of the inhabitants of Gastilonys moved to Grabučiškės in around 1960, when the Kaunas Reservoir was dammed.

Gallery

References 

Villages in Kaunas County